The following is a list of integrals (antiderivative functions) of irrational functions. For a complete list of integral functions, see lists of integrals. Throughout this article the constant of integration is omitted for brevity.

Integrals involving r =

Integrals involving s =  
Assume x2 > a2 (for x2 < a2, see next section):

 

 

 

 

Integrals involving u =

Integrals involving R =  

Assume (ax2 + bx + c) cannot be reduced to the following expression (px + q)2 for some p and q.

Integrals involving S =

References 
 
 Milton Abramowitz and Irene A. Stegun, eds., Handbook of Mathematical Functions with Formulas, Graphs, and Mathematical Tables 1972, Dover: New York. (See chapter 3.)
  (Several previous editions as well.)

Irrational functions